Karl Allred is an American politician who served as the Secretary of State of Wyoming. He was appointed by Wyoming governor Mark Gordon in September 2022 to replace Edward Buchanan, who resigned on September 15 to become a Goshen County district court judge. He is a member of the Republican Party.

Political career
Allred has unsuccessfully run for the Wyoming Legislature in 2010, 2014, and 2022. He was a member of the electoral college from Wyoming in 2016 and 2020.

After the resignation on September 15, 2022, of Wyoming Secretary of State Edward Buchanan, governor Mark Gordon was required to choose from three candidates nominated by the Wyoming Republican Party's Central Committee. The committee nominated Allred along with Marti Halverson, president of Right to Life of Wyoming, and Evan Miller, the chairman of the Sheridan County Republican Party. Gordon selected Allred after interviewing the three candidates.

Personal life
Allred lives in Uinta County.

Electoral history

References

External links

21st-century American politicians
Living people
People from Uinta County, Wyoming
Secretaries of State of Wyoming
Wyoming Republicans
Year of birth missing (living people)